Filip Švaříček (born December 30, 1991) is a Czech professional ice hockey player. He played one game in Czech Extraliga with HC Sparta Praha during the 2010–11 Czech Extraliga postseason.

References

External links

1991 births
Living people
Czech ice hockey defencemen
LHK Jestřábi Prostějov players
HC Kobra Praha players
HC Sparta Praha players
Ice hockey people from Prague
HC Stadion Litoměřice players
Competitors at the 2017 Winter Universiade